Commins Coch Halt railway station was a station in Commins Coch, Powys, Wales. The station opened on 19 October 1931 and closed on 14 June 1965. The halt was located between the railway and the A470 road and consisted of a short timber edged platform and a waiting shelter.

References

Sources

Disused railway stations in Powys
Railway stations in Great Britain opened in 1931
Railway stations in Great Britain closed in 1965
Former Great Western Railway stations
Beeching closures in Wales